Walter de Saleron (a.k.a. Walter of London), sixth Archbishop of Tuam, 1257–1258.

Formerly Archdeacon of Norfolk (1239 to c.1254) and Dean of St Paul's, London (1254-1257), de Saleron was consecrated by the Pope 6 September 1257. His appointment was controversial because the Chapter of Tuam had already unanimously elected James Ó Lachtáin, who received the king's confirmation later, on 16 October 1257, but because of de Saleron's appointment, was never able to take possession.  De Saleron received possession of the temporalities on 6 November 1257 but had died before 22 April 1258.

The History of the Popes says of him:
He never personally visited his see, having been cut off by death at London, on his way home from Rome.

References

 Fasti Ecclesiae Anglicanae 1066-1300
 http://www.ucc.ie/celt/published/T100005C/
 https://archive.org/stream/fastiecclesiaehi04cottuoft#page/n17/mode/2up

Archbishops of Tuam
13th-century English people
Clergy from London
13th-century Roman Catholic archbishops in Ireland
1258 deaths
Deans of St Paul's
Year of birth unknown